Citharus linguatula, the spotted flounder or Atlantic spotted flounder, is a species of fish in the Citharidae, a family of flounders. It is of minor importance to local commercial fisheries. This species is the only known member of its monotypic genus.

References
 

Pleuronectiformes
Fish described in 1758
Taxa named by Carl Linnaeus